The Port of Raahe is a cargo port located in the city of Raahe on the west coast of Finland, on the eastern shore of the Bothnian Bay.

In 2018, the port handled  5.2 million tons of international cargo, of which over 80% was imports. This makes Raahe the fourth-busiest import port in Finland, by tonnage.

Specifications
The port comprises the following facilities:
Deep-water quay: RO-RO ramp and two berths, depth 
Lapaluoto harbour: three berths, depth 
SSAB steelworks harbour: six berths, depth 
Three quay cranes and three mobile cranes

References

External links

Raahe
Water transport in Finland
Buildings and structures in North Ostrobothnia
Raahe